Artem Volodymyrovych Kusliy (born 7 July 1981) is a Ukrainian football goalkeeper.

Kusliy played for Dnipro, Naftovyk and Kryvbas in the Ukrainian Premier League.

See also
 2001 FIFA World Youth Championship squads#Ukraine

External links
 
Profile on Official Website

1981 births
Living people
Footballers from Dnipro
Ukrainian footballers
Ukraine youth international footballers
Ukraine under-21 international footballers
FC Dnipro players
FC Dnipro-2 Dnipropetrovsk players
FC Dnipro-3 Dnipropetrovsk players
FC Kryvbas Kryvyi Rih players
FC Naftovyk-Ukrnafta Okhtyrka players
Ukrainian Premier League players
Ukrainian First League players
Ukrainian Second League players
Association football goalkeepers
Ukrainian football managers